The Japanese occupation of Guam was the period in the history of Guam between 1941 and 1944 when Imperial Japanese forces occupied Guam during World War II. The island was renamed Ōmiya-Jima ('Great Shrine Island').

Events leading to the occupation

The Battle of Guam in 1941 was an engagement during the Pacific War in World War II which took place on 8 December 1941 on Guam in the Mariana Islands between the Japanese and Allied forces. 
Naval Governor of Guam George McMillin surrendered to the Japanese forces around 7:00 a.m. on 10 December 1941, ceding control of the island.

Life during the occupation

During the occupation period, Chamorros were forced to endure the hardships of the military occupation. For the first four months, the island was controlled by army troops, who were housed in schools and government buildings in Agana.

Japan intended to maintain Guam as a permanent territory beyond the war and thus invested resources, by way of teachers and education supplies, to launch the campaign of their Japanization policy. The goal was to bring the indigenous Chamorro people into the Japanese nation through total assimilation of Japanese culture and ideology. The task was at first thought to be a swift and easy one, as the population of Guam was small; however, these Japanization efforts later faced difficulty, supposedly due to the Americanization of the Chamorros during the prior 40 years under US control. Cars, radios, and cameras were confiscated and food was rationed until supplies became exhausted.

Control of the island came under the Imperial Japanese Navy in March 1942. The , as it was known, governed the populace for about 19 months. Chamorros were allowed to remain on their farms and trade for products they needed. Social activities including parties, Japanese movies, and sports competitions were allowed. Schools were reopened and Chamorros were required to learn the Japanese language and customs, with English being forbidden. Adults and children were taught reading, writing, math, and Japanese games and songs.

Before Japanese occupation, Guam's economy was semi-self-sufficient through the exportation of copra. However, the economy was deeply impacted by the war and the Japanese occupation caused further damage through setting a low exchange rate of US dollars to the Japanese yen. There was also unreasonable seizure of assets, destruction of homes, and shortage of food and other necessities for the locals. Chamorros' labor was also exploited through Japanese-led land development and fortifications. The Japanese military also occupied land that was essential to the agriculture and the economy of Guam.

Events leading to end of the occupation

By early 1944, Japan's war efforts were failing. Social activities were terminated, schools were closed, and Chamorro men, women, and children over the age of 12 were forced to work long hours in the fields, repair or build airstrips and defense installations, and dig hundreds of Japanese cave shelters, many of which are within the boundaries of War in the Pacific National Historical Park on Guam. Chamorros, laboring at bayonet point, were mistreated and, in some cases, executed after completing defense installations. Without warning, 10,000–15,000 Chamorros of all ages were forced to march, with only the belongings they could carry to camps in Guam's central and southern jungles. With inadequate shelter, minimal food, and no sanitary facilities, life in these camps was miserable. Despite hardships, however, incarceration proved to be a blessing in disguise for those who survived the camps, as had they not been moved, many Chamorros would have been killed by the American bombs and Japanese cross fire.

End of the occupation

On 21 July, the Americans landed on both sides of the Orote Peninsula. On the western side of Guam, the Americans endeavored to cut off the airfield. The 3rd Marine Division landed near Agana to the north of Orote at 08:28, and the 1st Provisional Marine Brigade landed near Agat to the south. Japanese artillery sank 20 LVTs, but by 09:00 tanks were ashore at both beaches. The 77th Infantry Division had a more difficult landing. Lacking amphibious vehicles, they had to wade ashore from the edge of the reef where they were dropped by their landing craft.

Japanese counterattacks were made throughout the first few days of the battle, mostly at night, using infiltration tactics. Several times they penetrated the American defenses and were driven back with heavy loss of men and equipment. Lieutenant General Takeshi Takashina was killed on 28 July, and Lieutenant General Hideyoshi Obata took over the command of the defenders.

Supply was very difficult for the Americans in the first days of the battle. Landing ships could not come closer than the reef, several hundred meters from the beach, and amphibious vehicles were scarce. However, the two beachheads were joined up on 28 July, and the Orote airfield and Apra Harbor were captured by 30 July.

The counterattacks around the American beachheads had exhausted the Japanese. At the start of August they were running out of food and ammunition and had only a handful of tanks left. Obata withdrew his troops from the south of Guam, planning to make a stand in the mountainous central part of the island. But with resupply and reinforcement impossible because of American control of the sea and air around Guam, he could hope to do no more than delay the inevitable defeat for a few days.

Rain and thick jungle made conditions difficult for the Americans, but after an engagement at Mount Barrigada from 2 to 4 August, the Japanese line collapsed and the rest of the battle was a pursuit to the north. As in other battles of the Pacific War, the Japanese refused to surrender, and almost all were killed.

On 10 August 1944, the American forces succeeded in wiping out the Japanese occupiers ending the occupation, although a small number of Japanese Holdouts would remain in hiding in caves throughout the island, the last being found in 1972.

Life after occupation
As a result of the end of the Japanese occupation, Guam celebrates with a yearly Liberation Day on 21 July. The island also holds a procession on 8 December; this also commemorates the day of the Japanese attack. On this day, people gather in Hagatna and watch parades and have carnivals. The results of the Japanese military occupation led to strong anti-Japanese views from the Chamorros that continued until late 1960s. A majority of the hostility was directed at the Japanese residents in Guam. Many were expelled to either Japan or Saipan and some were even tried in court. The impacts of the war are still seen today, through the unpaid war reparation claims. Due to the Treaty of Peace with Japan, Guam is unable to ask Japan to pay the war claims, instead seeking reparations from the US.

Since June 2006, the US Congress, the House Judiciary Committee, and the Department of Justice have worked together to approve a bill for Chamorro war reparations. Within the Department of Justice's Foreign Claims Settlement Commission, the Guam Claims Program is still actively looking at cases and providing compensations for Guam victims.

Monuments and historical markers in Guam relating to the occupation
War in the Pacific National Historical Park near to Asan, Guam
Plaza de Espana - Hagatna, Guam
Caves and Jails in Tutuhan Park - Hagatna, Guam

See also
 Japanese holdout

References

External links
WAPA – The Occupation of Guam
Department of Justice - Guam Claims Program

20th century in Guam
History of Guam
Guam
Military history of Japan during World War II
World War II occupied territories
1941 establishments in Guam
1942 in Guam
1943 in Guam
1944 in Guam
Guam
Guam
States and territories established in 1941
States and territories disestablished in 1944
Military in Guam
Axis powers